Nempont-Saint-Firmin is a commune in the Pas-de-Calais department in the Hauts-de-France region of France.

Geography
Nempont-Saint-Firmin is situated in the valley of the Authie river, the border with the department of the Somme, some 8 miles (13 km) south of Montreuil-sur-Mer, on the N1 road.

Population
The inhabitants of the town of Nempont-Saint-Firmin are called Nempontois, Nempontoises in French.

Places of interest
 The eighteenth century church of St. Firmin.

See also
Communes of the Pas-de-Calais department

References

Nempontsaintfirmin